John Oscroft (21 July 1807 – 28 September 1857) was an English cricketer. Oscroft's batting and bowling styles are unknown. He was born at Arnold, Nottinghamshire.

Oscroft made his first-class debut for Nottingham Cricket Club against Cambridge Town Club in 1834 at Parker's Piece. He made two further first-class appearances in 1834, making a second appearance against Cambridge Town Club at the Forest New Ground and an appearance against Sheffield Cricket Club at Hyde Park Ground, Sheffield. His next first-class appearance came in 1842 for the Gentlemen of Nottinghamshire against the Players of Nottinghamshire at Trent Bridge, with him also making his first-class debut for Nottinghamshire against England in that same season. He made four further first-class appearances for Nottinghamshire, the last of which came against Sussex in 1848. In his nine first-class matches, Oscroft scored 137 runs at an average of 10.53, with a high score of 28. He also took two wickets with the ball.

He died at Nottingham, Nottinghamshire on 28 September 1857.

References

External links
John Oscroft at ESPNcricinfo
John Oscroft at CricketArchive

1807 births
1857 deaths
People from Arnold, Nottinghamshire
Cricketers from Nottinghamshire
English cricketers
Nottingham Cricket Club cricketers
Nottinghamshire cricketers
Players of Nottinghamshire cricketers